The Hongzhi Emperor (30 July 1470 – 9 June 1505) was the tenth Emperor of the Ming dynasty, reigned from 1487 to 1505. Born Zhu Youcheng, he was the eldest surviving son of the Chenghua Emperor and his reign as emperor of China is called the "Hongzhi Restoration" (弘治中興). His era name, "Hongzhi", means "great governance". A peace-loving emperor, the Hongzhi Emperor also had only one empress and no concubines, granting him the distinction of being the sole perpetually monogamous emperor in Chinese history, besides Emperor Fei of Western Wei (although the partially recognized Longwu Emperor of the Southern Ming was also known for devotion to his wife).

Early years

Zhu Youcheng was born on 30 July 1470 to the Chenghua Emperor and Consort Ji (紀氏). Consort Ji was one of the Yao women captured during the suppression of an uprising in the southern Chinese province of Guangxi and then bought into the palace. Youcheng inherited a Southern appearance from his mother: a small figure and darker skin. He is also said to have intelligent and clear eyes and would grow a mustache and a thin beard. He was not physically strong, with his strength being lost in later years.

Zhu was raised in secret by his mother, the abandoned Empress Wu, and various eunuchs who swore secrecy not to expose Zhu Youcheng and upset Emperor Chenghua's favourite concubine Consort Wan, who was trying to conceive a child of her own. To this end, Lady Wan would eliminate rival concubines and order any pregnancies to be forcibly aborted, as her own child died shortly after birth in 1466. Zhu Youcheng was only reunited with his father by 1475 at the age of five and was created crown prince. He had been a brilliant child early on and received the best education offered at that time; he was immersed in Confucian schooling and excelled in his studies.

Reign as emperor

After the Hongzhi Emperor ascended the throne in 1487, his administration was modeled after Confucian ideology and he became a hardworking and diligent emperor. He closely supervised all affairs of state, lowered taxes, reduced government spending and made wise decisions when employing ministers to government post. Individuals such as Liu Jian, Xie Qian and Wang Shu worked hand in hand with the Hongzhi Emperor, thus creating a seldom-witnessed atmosphere of cooperation within the government. In addition, the emperor also encouraged his ministers to be up front about all issues, even acknowledging criticisms directed towards the emperor himself. This created a more transparent government and introduced fresh energy into the Ming dynasty. As a result, the populace once again prospered under his rule. It was said that individual eunuchs' power was curtailed and palace intrigues, prevalent in previous reigns, were absent during his reign. The Hongzhi Emperor has been compared to the Hongwu Emperor and Yongle Emperor as one of the most brilliant emperors of the Ming dynasty.

In the spring of 1488, the shipwrecked Joseon crew of the Jeju Island official Choe Bu (1454–1504) were traveling up the Grand Canal while escorted by the Ming courier service en route back to Korea. Choe observed ferry ships passing by holding officials who were from the Ministries of War, Justice, and Personnel. When he asked what was going on, it was explained to him that the new Hongzhi Emperor was ridding his government of corrupt and incompetent officials, and this was a final gesture of good will by the emperor by providing them with a comfortable passage back home by ship.

The Hongzhi's policies demonstrated tolerance with Islam and Chinese Muslims;  Ali Akbar Khata'i, the Ottoman geographer, recorded the relationship between the emperor and the Muslim community in China, Akbar said “he has many Muslims in his court”.

Succession crisis

Unlike almost all of his predecessors and successors who took up many concubines who bore many children to the emperor, the Hongzhi Emperor had only one Empress during his lifetime. Coupled with the fact that Empress Zhang had only two sons (one of whom died in infancy), the Hongzhi Emperor was left with only one nominee to succeed him. After the emperor died in 1505, he was succeeded by his son, the Zhengde Emperor. The Zhengde Emperor died childless in 1521 and the throne had to be passed to a cousin from Hubei named Zhu Houcong, effectively ending the Hongzhi Emperor's own line of succession.

Family
Consort and Issue:
 Empress Xiaochengjing, of the Zhang clan (1471–1541)
 Zhu Houzhao, the Zhengde Emperor (27 October 1491 – 20 April 1521), first son
 Princess Taikang (1494 – 1 October 1498), personal name Xiurong, first daughter
 Zhu Houwei, Prince Dao of Wei (1 January 1495 – 9 March 1496), second son

Ancestry

See also
 Chinese emperors family tree (late)

References

Citations

Sources 

 Brook, Timothy. (1998). The Confusions of Pleasure: Commerce and Culture in Ming China. Berkeley, CA: University of California Press. .

1470 births
1505 deaths
Ming dynasty emperors
15th-century Chinese monarchs
16th-century Chinese monarchs